Lisbon Harbour Control Tower is a 38 metre tall control tower at the end of an artificial peninsula in Lisbon, Portugal. The building is of an ultramodern design where it tilts towards the opening to the harbour. The nine storey tower was designed by Gonçalo Sousa Byrne and is owned by the Governo da Republica Portuguesa.

The lower section of the tower is made of horizontally placed copper whilst the final three storeys are glass. This is done so that the building looks like an ultramodern lighthouse.

The control tower was inaugurated on July 16, 2001 and won the First Prize at the TECU Architecture Awards on May 9, 2003.

External links
Archidose: Lisbon Harbor Control Tower
Structurae: Lisbon Harbor Control Tower

Buildings and structures completed in 2001
Harbour Control Tower
Water transport in Portugal
Inclined towers